Eyal Boers (born July 8, 1975) is an Israeli film director, producer and researcher.

Biography 
Eyal Boers was born in Jerusalem. His parents moved to the Netherlands shortly after his birth, first to Leiden and then to Amsterdam. After completing his first year at the Jewish school "Rosj Pina", Amsterdam, his parents returned to Israel and lived in Ramat Hasharon, where he was educated at Amirim primary school and in the Alumim middle school. After completing his the 8th grade, his parents moved to Australia and lived in Sydney, where he graduated from Moriah College High School.
 
He did his military service in Golani Brigade, and finished as a joint patrol officer in the Israel Border Police.

Boers holds a bachelor's degree in political science and philosophy from Tel Aviv University, an MFA from the Department of Film and Television at Tel Aviv University and an MA from the Interdisciplinary Program for Graduate Studies at Tel Aviv University.
His Ph.D. degree was received from Tel Aviv University, in 2022. Boers authored the thesis "The Jew in Dutch cinema: images, stereotypes and national identity", under the supervision of Prof. Ilan Avisar.

During his academic studies, Boers worked as a cameraman from 2004 to 2010, including for the Israeli Channel 1, Dutch current affairs program EenVandaag and Globes (newspaper) TV. He was a member of the Israeli Documentary Filmmakers Forum from 2008 to 2018 and a member of the Israeli Academy of Film and Television from 2014 to 2018.

As part of his studies, he wrote, produced and directed in 2007 the short film "A Lone Soldier" which had been screened in many international film festivals. In 2008 he produced and directed the documentary "Classmates of Anne Frank" which had been screened at numerous international film festivals and had been broadcast by Israeli and Dutch television channels. In 2012, he produced and directed the documentary "Live or Die in Entebbe" which had been screened at various international film festivals and had been broadcast on Israeli and Canadian television channels.

Boers has worked as a lecturer in the Film Department at "Minshar School of Art" and Ariel University.
In 2011, he was appointed head of the film and television track at Ariel University's School of Communication.
In 2018, he was appointed chairman of the Israel Film Council.

He is head of the film and television track at Ariel University's School of Communication.
Eyal is a lecturer on film history, European cinema, videography, cinematic expression and the image of the Jew in Film. Was the chairman of the Israel Film Council, from 2018 till 2022.

Selected filmography 
 Land of the Little People (Line producer 2016, 83 minutes): Full-length feature film. The film has participated in dozens of festivals around the world, including: Shanghai International Film Festival, Haifa International Film Festival,and the  Warsaw Film Festival .
 Live Or Die In Entebbe (Producer and director 2012, 52 minutes): A documentary about Operation Entebbe (English; Hebrew; French). Pre-purchase by Radio Canada. Purchase by Israeli Channel 1. Premiere screening at the Jerusalem Jewish Film Festival 10.12.12. Premiere broadcast on Israeli Channel 1 on February 4, 2013. Screened at the Paris Israeli Film Festival, the Toronto Jewish Film Festival, the Australian Jewish Film Festival.
 Classmates of Anne Frank (Producer and director 2007, 58 minutes): Documentary about Anne Frank (English; Hebrew; Dutch); The film served as the basis for the book "We all Wore Stars: Memories of Anne Frank from her Classmates" which was published in 2011; The film aired on Israeli Channel 1 and was screened at dozens of international film festivals, including the Dakino International Film Festival in Romania, the Independent European Film Festival in Paris, the São Paulo Jewish Film Festival .
 A Lone Soldier (Screenwriter, producer and director, 2006, 22 minutes): Short feature film (Hebrew; Dutch; Arabic). Acquired for broadcast by Israeli Channel 1 and screened at dozens of international film festivals, including the Belgrade Documentary and Short Film Festival, the Cambridge Film Festival, the Hamburg International Short Film Festival.

References

External links 
 Eyal Boers channel at YouTube

Academic staff of Tel Aviv University
1975 births
Living people
Israeli film directors